The Summerlee Iron Works  (1836–1930) was an iron works established in Coatbridge, Scotland. The site has been incorporated into the Summerlee, Museum of Scottish Industrial Life.

History
The Summerlee Iron Works was an early adopter of the 'Hot Blast Process', recently patented by James Beaumont Neilson in 1828. This process burned waste furnace gases in regenerative stoves, to heat up a lattice of fire bricks inside them. Once the bricks were sufficiently heated, the waste furnace gases were purged and replaced by fresh air intended to fire the furnaces. The fire bricks transferred their heat to this air, turning it into the 'hot blast' pumped into the furnaces.

No traces of the original small rectangular stoves remain, but foundations of the round Cowper Stoves, that were as tall as the furnaces themselves (20 m) and installed in the 1870s, are visible.

The iron works closed in the early 1930s during the Great Depression and was demolished in 1938. Additional demolition took place in the 1950s during the construction of the Hydrocon crane factory.

Excavation
The site was excavated between 1985–1987 by the Manpower Services Commission and again in 2000 by Glasgow University Archaeological Research Division. Four furnace hearths were excavated and are, together with the furnace bank wall, the most notable remains of the iron works.

Notes

References
 
 

1836 establishments in Scotland
1930 disestablishments in Scotland
Ironworks and steelworks in Scotland
Defunct iron and steel mills